Ranong ( . not to be confused with Rayong) is one of Thailand's southern provinces (changwat), on the west coast along the Andaman Sea. It has the fewest inhabitants of all Thai provinces (making it the least populous of all the Thai provinces). provinces neighboring Ranong are (clockwise) Chumphon, Surat Thani, and Phang Nga. To the west, it borders Kawthaung, Tanintharyi, Myanmar.

Geography
It has a long coast on the Andaman Sea. The province, together with Trat province, is known for being one of the wettest places in Thailand, the rainy season lasting for about eight months.

Ranong is the least populated province. In former years the major industry was tin mining, but most mines are now exhausted. White clay mining (for the production of porcelain) and fishing are now the main industries, along with rubber and cashew nuts.

The Ngao Mangrove Forest Research Centre, also known as the Ranong Biosphere Reserve, in the north of Kapoe District, covering 189,431 rai (303.09 km2), was declared in 1997. It is the fourth biosphere reserve of Thailand, and the only one on the seacoast protecting mangrove forests.

National parks
There are four national parks, along with seven other national parks, make up region 4 (Surat Thani) of Thailand's protected areas. 
 Namtok Ngao National Park, 
 Mu Ko Ranong National Park, 
 Laem Son National Park, 
 Lam Nam Kra Buri National Park,

Wildlife sanctuaries
 Khlong Nakha Wildlife Sanctuary, 
 Khuan Mae Yai Mon Wildlife Sanctuary, 
 Thung Raya–Na Sak Wildlife Sanctuary, 
 Prince Chumphon South Park Wildlife Sanctuary,

History
Ranong province once was a deputy town of Chumphon in the Ayutthaya era (1350–1767). It was a small, mountainous town that protected Chumphon from Burma. The population was very low until the discovery of tin, when people from many cities and foreigners started to visit Ranong to do tin business there. This also gave rise to the name Ranong, which was a distorted form of rae nong (แร่นอง), meaning "full of minerals". The ruler of Ranong was known after the town as Luang Ranong

At the start of the Rattanakosin era (1781–present), a wealthy Chinese merchant, Kho Su Jiang bought a majority share of the tin business in Ranong and was appointed tax collector of the region, with the title Luang Rattana Setti, by King Nangklao (Rama III). In 1854, the Luang Ranong died. King Mongkut (Rama IV) then promoted Kho Su Jiang to the position, promoting him to Phra Rattana Setti. By then, Ranong's wealth had increased greatly and through taxation was a significant source of income for the capital, thus in 1877 King Chulalongkorn (Rama V) elevated Ranong to provincial status, answering directly to Bangkok as opposed to Chumphon, with Phra Rattana Setti becoming its first governor.

After the First Anglo-Burmese War, when the British assumed control of Tenasserim and the Kraburi River became the demarcation line between Siam and British-controlled Burma, Ranong became an important border city where goods were exchanged, a status that it still holds today.

Being located on the Kra Isthmus, the narrowest part (44 kilometres) of the Malay Peninsula, a proposal of a canal through the area has been long suggested, particularly by the French. If successful, traveling from Europe to China would be faster through this route instead of circumnavigating the Malay Peninsula. This was seen as a threat to the financial growth of the harbors of Singapore and Penang, which at the time were owned by Britain, who therefore forced the suspension of the project.  At the end of World War II, Thailand signed a British-imposed treaty called "The Termination of The State of War Between Siam and Allies", which forbade Thailand from digging such a canal without British permission. This treaty was revoked in 1954. Since then, plans for the canal have continued to be suggested and discussed, even in the present day, though Prime Minister Prayut Chan-o-cha said in 2018 that it was not a government priority.

Ranong has also been historically significant as a residence for royal tours of the southern provinces, with many kings of Thailand visiting Ranong in the past. The first was King Chulalongkorn, who stayed at Rattana Ransan palace for three nights in 1890. The palace is now a landmark in Ranong. King Prajadhipok (Rama VII) visited in 1928, and King Bhumibol (Rama IX) and Queen Sirikit visited in 1959.

Climate
Most of Thailand receives from 1,200 to 1,600 mm of precipitation per year. Two provinces, Ranong and Trat, receive more than 4,500 mm a year making them the wettest places in the country.

Symbols
The provincial seal shows a castle on top of a hill, as an aide memoire that King Chulalongkorn (Rama V) once visited Ranong and stayed at the Ratana Rangsan Castle on top of the Niveskiri Hill. The number five refers to King Rama V; the castle is Ratana Rangsan Palace; the mountain is Niveshkiri; the royal tray refers to the people of Ranong.

The provincial slogan is, "Kra Isthmus, mountain grass, cashew nut, mineral water stream, and real pearl of Ranong."

The provincial tree is the Banaba (Lagerstroemia speciosa), and the provincial flower is the orchid Dendrobium formosum.

Administrative divisions

Provincial government

Ranong is divided into five districts (amphoe). These are further divided into 30 subdistricts (tambon) and 167 villages (muban).

Local government
As of 26 November 2019 there are: one Ranong  Provincial Administration Organisation and 12 municipal (thesaban) areas in the province. Ranong and Bang Rin have town (thesaban mueang) status. Further 10 subdistrict municipalities (thesaban tambon). The non-municipal areas are administered by 18 Subdistrict Administrative Organisations - SAO (ongkan borihan suan tambon).

Transportation
Phet Kasem Road (Thailand Route 4) runs through the city.

The Port Authority of Thailand operates the Ranong Port, which is Thailand's principal Indian Ocean port. In 2008, the Ranong human-smuggling incident resulted in 54 deaths.

Human achievement index 2017

Since 2003, United Nations Development Programme (UNDP) in Thailand has tracked progress on human development at sub-national level using the Human Achievement Index (HAI), a composite index covering all the eight key areas of human development. National Economic and Social Development Board (NESDB) has taken over this task since 2017.

Tourism
Namtok Ngao National Park (อุทยานแห่งชาติน้ำตกหงาว)  Covering a total area of approximately 417,500 rai (668 km2) it was declared a national park on 3 June 1999.

Ko Chang (Ranong) (เกาะช้าง) island in tambon Ko Phayam. With an area of 18 square kilometres and 80 homes on the entire island. Cashew and para rubber plantations as well as coastal fisheries are the main industries.

Laem Son National Park  (อุทยานแห่งชาติแหลมสน) It covers a total area of 196,875 rai (31.5 hectares). It also includes islands in the Andaman Sea; namely, Ko Khangkhao and Mu Ko Kam. Places of interest within the national park include:

Hat Bang Ben (หาดบางเบน) is a long sandy beach shaded by pine trees where the national park headquarters is located.
Hat Laem Son (หาดแหลมสน) is a white sandy beach approximately four kilometres next to Hat Bang Ben.
Hat Praphat or Hat Hin Thung (หาดประพาส หรือ หาดหินทุ่ง) Similar to Hat Bang Ben, Hat Praphat is a large beach shaded by pine trees.
Ko Khangkhao (เกาะค้างคาว) is an island with fine sandy beaches and a gravel beach known as Hat Hin Ngam in the north.
Ko Kam Yai (เกาะกำใหญ่) is a scenic island with white sandy beaches.
Ko Kam Nui (เกาะกำนุ้ย) is not far from Ko Kam Yai with beaches on one side and many other nearby islets.

References

External links

 Official website
 Ranong provincial map, coat of arms and postal stamp

 
Provinces of Thailand
Andaman Sea
Southern Thailand